Amal Azzudin (born 1990) is a Somali-Scottish campaigner and activist who co-founded the Glasgow Girls, a group of seven young women who campaigned against the harsh treatment of asylum-seekers in response to the detention of one of their friends. The group's efforts raised public awareness and won the support of the Scottish Parliament. Azzudin has been featured in The Guardian, The Herald, The Scotsman, The Press and Journal, The Sunday Post.

Early life
Azzudin moved from Egypt to Glasgow, Scotland, with her mother in 2000. Four years later the Home Office granted the family leave to remain.

She is one of the founders of The Glasgow Girls – a group of Drumchapel High School students who, from 2005, campaigned against dawn raids and the deportation of refugee families. The other girls were Roza Salih, Ewelina Siwak, Toni-Lee Henderson, Jennifer McCarron and Emma Clifford. The group was formed after the home of one of their school friends, Agnesa Murselaj, a Roma from Kosovo, was dawn-raided one Sunday morning by 14 bullet-proof vested officers from the UK Border Force. After several weeks the family had not been released. “Even though I had my leave to remain, I couldn’t just sit there. I had to do something. That could have been my family,” Azzudin says.

The Glasgow Girls campaign 
The Glasgow Girls, encouraged by teacher Euan Girvan, formed a strategy to campaign on behalf of the family. Their online petitions to the Home Office went viral, and the then First Minister of Scotland, Jack McConnell agreed to meet them. The Glasgow Girls not only successfully prevented the deportation of the Murselaj family, but also forced a change in the asylum protocols.

Career and later life 
Since leaving University, Amal Azzudin has worked for the Mental Health Foundation in Scotland as Equality and Human Rights Officer. Her main role is to manage the refugee programme, including the Sawti project. Sawti, which means “my voice” in Arabic, aims to raise awareness of mental health and wellbeing and has developed a mentoring scheme for refugees and asylum seekers in Scotland.

In 2015, Azzudin accompanied campaigners Margaret Woods and Pinar Aksu to Lesvos, where as many as 3000 refugees per day were arriving from Turkey. She wrote a diary of her experiences for The Herald Scotland.

She is an ambassador for the Scottish Refugee Council.

Awards
 2016 Saltire Society's Young Outstanding Woman of Scotland. Azzudin was winner of a Special Award to commemorate Saltire Society's 80th Anniversary 
 2016 Named one of the Young Women's Movement Outstanding Woman of Scotland

Further reading
Hill, Emma and Craith, Máiréad Nic. "Medium and Narrative Change: The Effects of Multiple Media on the “Glasgow Girls” Story and Their Real-Life Campaign". Narrative Culture. Vol. 3, No. 1 (Spring 2016), pp. 87–109.
Penketh, Laura. "Asylum, immigration and anti-racism – an interview with Amal Azzudin." Critical and Radical Social Work. Vol. 3 (August 2015).

References

External links

1990 births
People associated with Glasgow
Scottish activists
Living people
Alumni of the University of Glasgow
Refugees in the United Kingdom
Women human rights activists
Scottish human rights activists
Egyptian emigrants to Scotland